Sheykhabad-e Chah Hajji (also Romanized as Sheykhābād-e Chāh Ḩājjī; also known as Sheikh Abad Kahnooj, Sheykhābād, and Sheykhābād-e Kahnūj) is a village in Howmeh Rural District, in the Central District of Kahnuj County, Kerman Province, Iran. At the 2006 census, its population was 349, in 88 families.

References 

Populated places in Kahnuj County